The Jackson–Einspahr Sod House near Holstein, Nebraska, United States, is a sod house that was built in phases between 1881 and 1910.  It was listed on the U.S. National Register of Historic Places in 2006.

References

Houses on the National Register of Historic Places in Nebraska
Houses completed in 1881
Houses in Adams County, Nebraska
Sod houses
National Register of Historic Places in Adams County, Nebraska
1881 establishments in Nebraska